3-Aminobenzoic acid (also known as meta-aminobenzoic acid or MABA) is an organic compound with the molecular formula H2NC6H4CO2H.  MABA is a white solid, although commercial samples are often colored.  It is only slightly soluble in water. It is soluble in acetone, boiling water, hot alcohol, hot chloroform and ether. It consists of a benzene ring substituted with an amino group and a carboxylic acid.

See also
 Aminomethylbenzoic acid
 Anthranilic acid
 4-Aminobenzoic acid
 Arene substitution pattern
 Non-proteinogenic amino acids

References

Anilines
Benzoic acids